Bayford may refer to:
People
Baron Bayford, a title in the Peerage of the United Kingdom
David Bayford (1739–1790), English surgeon
Dick Bayford (1885–1939), Australian rules footballer
James Bayford (1804–1871), English rower
Robert Augustus Bayford (1838–1922), English lawyer
Robert Frederic Bayford (1871–1951), English lawyer

Places

Bayford, Hertfordshire, England
Bayford railway station
Bayford, Somerset, England
Bayford, Virginia

Other
Bayford & Co, a British conglomerate company